The Edmonton Hundred Historical Society is a historical society devoted to the study of the area covered by the Edmonton Hundred (a hundred being an ancient division of a county). The society is a registered charity No. 299073. David Pam, FRHS, was the president until his death in 2014.

Selected publications
The society has published over 60 works in its "occasional papers" series as well as numerous other works.
Avery, D. Heinous and Grievous Offences. 
Avery, D. Madam Susanna Avery, Her Book. Capels Manor, Enfield, its Occupants, Garden and Kitchen 1688. 
Avery, D. Saxon Enfield: The Place-Name Evidence and Scholars and Pluralists: Three Tudor Vicars in Enfield. 
Avery, D. The Medieval Merchant-Gentry of Edmonton Hundred. 
Burnby, J.G.L. & A.E. Robinson. And they Blew Exceeding Fine. 
Burnby, J.G.L. & A.E. Robinson. Guns and Gunpowder in Enfield. 
Burnby, J.G.L. & A.E. Robinson. Now Turned Into Fair Garden Plots. 
Burnby, J.G.L. Drovers and Tanners of Enfield and Edmonton. 
Burnby, J.G.L. Elizabethan Times in Tottenham, Edmonton and Enfield. 
Collicott, S. Enfield School Board. 
Dalling, G. David Waddington and the Great Pew Controversy. 
Dalling, G. Southgate and Edmonton Street Names. 
Doree, S. Domesday Book and the Origins of Edmonton Hundred. 
Gough, T.W. War-time Letters from the Tottenham Home Front. 
Graham, M. Chase Farm Schools. 
Hawkes, H.G. Some Reflections on Education in Tottenham. 
Hawkes, H.G. The Reynardsons and their Almshouses. 
Hoare, E. Work of the Edmonton Vestry, 1739-43. 
Keeble, P. & R. Musgrove. Who was Heinrich Faulenbach? 
McIllven, R. The Edmonton Local Board of Health. 
Mott, R. A Southgate Boyhood. and B. M. Griffiths Williams. Highfield House, c.1818-1952. 
Musgrove, R. (Ed.) When the Gas Man Came to Call. (Memories of Reginald Chase) 
Pam, D. A Woodland Hamlet - Winchmore Hill. 
Pam, D. Edmonton Ancient Village to Working Class Suburb. 
Pam, C. Edmonton in the Early Twenties. The Garden City Estate. The Battle of the Flags. 
Pam, D. Enfield Town - Village Green to Shopping Precinct. 
Pam, D. The Hungry Years. Survival in Edmonton and Enfield before 1400. 
Phillips, P.L. Upon My Word I am No Scholar. 
Robinson, J. The History of Tottenham Grammar School. 
Tottenham Revisited.

References

External links
Edmonton Hundred Historical Society page on N21.net, archived from the original on July 31, 2016.
Edmonton Hundred Historical Society website

Historical societies of the United Kingdom
History of Hertfordshire
History of Edmonton
History of the London Borough of Enfield
Tottenham
Monken Hadley